Olga Semkina (born 23 July 1976) is a Russian former pair skater. She began competing internationally with Andrei Chuvilaev in 1994. The pair placed seventh at the 1995 World Junior Championships, held in Budapest in November 1994. They won gold at the 1995 Czech Skate, silver at the 1996 Nebelhorn Trophy, and bronze at the 1997 Winter Universiade.  

In 2000, Semkina intended to compete with Alexey Minin for Bulgaria. They trained in Moscow and Sofia, coached by Nina Mozer.

Results

With Minin for Bulgaria

With Chuvilaev for Russia

References 

1976 births
Russian female pair skaters
Living people
Figure skaters from Moscow
Universiade medalists in figure skating
Universiade bronze medalists for Russia
Competitors at the 1997 Winter Universiade